This article provides details of international association football games played by the Cambodia women's national soccer team.

Result

2018

2019

2022

References

External links 
 Cambodia Fixtures & Results – Soccerway.com

Women's national association football team results